The San Simeon Stakes is a Grade III American Thoroughbred horse race for horses aged three years old or older over the distance of about six and one-half furlongs on the turf scheduled annually in March at Santa Anita Park in Arcadia, California.

History 

The event was inaugurated in 2004 as the Daytona Handicap.

Due to course conditions, several runnings of the Daytona Handicap were taken off the turf and run on the dirt track.

The event was upgraded to a Grade III event for 2009.

In 2011 the race was renamed to the Daytona Stakes.

The event was originally scheduled in February but the Los Angeles Turf Club in late 2012 moved the race to the start of the winter racing meet at Santa Anita whereby the race was run twice in the calendar year.

In 2016 the Los Angeles Turf Club renamed the race to the current name.  The original San Simeon Stakes was renamed to the Daytona Stakes.

2020 saw the race shortened to   furlongs on turf, using the backstretch start, but since 2021, the distance was extended to the current six furlongs.

Records
Speed  record:
 furlongs: 1:11.21 – Law Abidin Citizen (2019)
  furlongs: 1:02.68 – Cistron (2020)

Margins:
  lengths – Desert Code (2009)

Most wins:
 2 – Bettys Bambino (2014, 2016)

Most wins by an owner:
 2 – Sharon Alesia, Bran Jam Stable & Ciaglia Racing (2014, 2016)
 2 – Gary Barber (2012, 2018)

Most wins by a jockey:
 2 – Garrett Gomez (2005, 2011)
 2 – Tiago Josue Pereira (2015, 2019)

Most wins by a trainer:
 3 – Philip D'Amato (2015, 2021, 2023)

Winners

Legend:

 
 

Notes:

ƒ Filly or Mare

See also
List of American and Canadian Graded races

References

Graded stakes races in the United States
Grade 3 stakes races in the United States
Flat horse races for four-year-olds
Open sprint category horse races
Horse races in California
Turf races in the United States
Recurring sporting events established in 2004
Santa Anita Park
2004 establishments in California